Henry McCarty (1882–1954) was an American screenwriter and film director. He was employed by several studios including Warner Brothers, RKO and Gotham Pictures in the silent and early sound eras. He directed eleven silent films between 1922 and 1926, generally for independent companies.

Selected filmography

Writer

 The Ranger and the Law (1921)
 Blue Blazes (1922)
 The Masked Avenger (1922)
 Silver Spurs (1922)
 Blazing Arrows (1922)
 The Vengeance of Pierre (1923)
 The Night Ship (1925)
 Shattered Lives (1925)
 Silent Pal (1925)
 One of the Bravest (1925)
 The Shadow on the Wall (1925)
 His Master's Voice (1925)
 Hearts and Spangles (1926)
 Sinews of Steel (1926)
 Black Butterflies (1928)
 Ladies' Night in a Turkish Bath (1928)
 The Carnation Kid (1929)
 Blaze o' Glory (1929)
 Señor Americano (1929)
 Song of Love (1929)
 Numbered Men (1930)
 Top Speed (1930)
 Sunny (1930)
 Going Wild (1930)
 Bright Lights (1930)
 The Mad Parade (1931)
 Men of America (1932)
 The Right to Romance (1933)
 Great Guy (1936)
 23 1/2 Hours Leave (1937)

Director
 Blazing Arrows (1922)
 Silver Spurs (1922)
 The Vengeance of Pierre (1923)
 Silent Pal (1925)
 The Night Ship (1925)
 Shattered Lives (1925)
 The Part Time Wife (1925)
 Flashing Fangs (1926)
 The Phantom of the Forest (1926)
 The Lodge in the Wilderness (1926)

References

Bibliography
 Gehring, Wes D. Joe E. Brown: Film Comedian and Baseball Buffoon. McFarland, 2014.
 Goble, Alan. The Complete Index to Literary Sources in Film. Walter de Gruyter, 1999.
Wlaschin, Ken. Silent Mystery and Detective Movies: A Comprehensive Filmography. McFarland, 2009.

External links

1882 births
1954 deaths
American male screenwriters
American film directors
People from San Francisco